is a Japanese voice actor.

For his portrayal of Saki Abdusha in You're Under Arrest, Makoto Kurumizawa in BOYS BE, Setsuna Aoki in Sakura Wars, and  Athrun Zala in Gundam SEED & Gundam Seed Destiny, he was chosen as the most popular voice actor in the Animage Anime Grand Prix in 2004, and won the Best Supporting Character (male) award at the 1st Seiyu Awards in 2007. He is best known for his roles as Cho Hakkai in Saiyuki, Katsura Kotarou in Gin Tama, Zeref Dragneel in Fairy Tail and Gaara in Naruto.

Filmography

Animation

Puppet

Theatrical animation

Video games

Tokusatsu

Audio drama

Dubbing roles

References

External links
 Official agency profile 
 
 
 

1967 births
Living people
Japanese male stage actors
Japanese male video game actors
Japanese male voice actors
Male voice actors from Aichi Prefecture
Mausu Promotion voice actors
Nihon University alumni
People from Nisshin, Aichi
Seiyu Award winners
20th-century Japanese male actors
21st-century Japanese male actors